Jana Hunter is an American songwriter and musician based in Baltimore.

Early life 
Hunter was born in Texas. His family is Catholic, but he no longer follows Catholicism.

Recording and band membership 
Hunter was signed to Gnomonsong, a record label run by Devendra Banhart and Vetiver's Andy Cabic. Hunter's solo debut album Blank Unstaring Heirs of Doom was the label's debut release. In 2007 Hunter founded an independent record label based in Houston, Texas, Feow! Records, with musicians Matthew Brownlie of Bring Back the Guns and Arthur Bates of Houston band Wicked Poseur.

Hunter was the singer and primary songwriter for Lower Dens. After releasing their debut, Twin-Hand Movement, on Gnomonsong in 2010, Lower Dens were one of the first bands signed to the Ribbon Music label and released their second album, Nootropics, on Ribbon in 2012.

Hunter has performed and/or recorded as a member of Jracula, Castanets, Matty & Mossy, Ejaculette, Unitus, and Krazy Nerds, and played in/recorded for Sharon Van Etten, Trentemøller, Food Pyramid, Airwaves, Indian Jewelry, Matteah Baim, Metallic Falcons, Phosphorescent, and CocoRosie.

Hunter is the inspiration for several characters in the stories of J.M. Appel, including providing the basis for Maggie in the novella Fallout (2010).

Touring
Hunter has toured with Tara Jane O'Neil, Devendra Banhart, Rasputina, Viking Moses, Castanets, Deer Tick, Marissa Nadler, Peter & the Wolf, Cass McCombs, and Woozyhelmet, among others.
In 2005, Hunter accompanied Meadows, Lights, and Mouth of Leaves on their Summer of Golden Blood tour throughout the South. In 2006, Hunter performed at North East Sticks Together.

Hunter has appeared at Mad Vicky's Tea House in Brooklyn, New York, owned by "Mad Vicky", Bianca Casady of the musical duo CocoRosie.

In 2019, Hunter created a special playlist for Billboards Summer of Pride event. The playlist, which can be found on Spotify, includes songs by various artists, including The Smiths and Stevie Wonder. Hunter said in the corresponding interview that these songs had both helped and inspired them whilst growing up.

“I was wild and in a lot of pain as a kid; home life was very bleak," Hunter told Nick Williams, the article writer. "Pop songs were a guaranteed escape to a mental space where beauty, wonder, and love were possible." They continued on to tell of the inspiration they received, saying that they "wanted to write songs that might have the potential to do that."

Matty and Mossy
Hunter founded and played in the Houston band Matty & Mossy with Heath Flagtvedt, Matt Frey and John Hunter. Their album, Fraimers Haimey, was recorded in Athens, Georgia with Chris Bishop and released on Fleece Records. The album reached #1 on the radio charts of Rice Radio and KSPC, and songs from the album were used in the soundtrack of Andrew Bujalski's films Funny Ha Ha and Mutual Appreciation.

Personal life 
In 2014, Hunter came out as gender fluid (or non-binary), as well being neither gay nor straight, stating that he "feel[s] extremely fortunate in that I truly don’t give a fuck when it comes to the gender of the person I’m dating". He also identifies as transmasculine.

In August 2019, an article by Billboard.com stated that Hunter preferred he/him pronouns. In an interview for the same magazine a month later, Hunter discussed his experience undergoing hormone replacement therapy, disclosing he had undergone top surgery and discussing the difficulties of testosterone lowering both his speaking and singing voice.

In 2021, Hunter revealed he had been diagnosed as having autism and attention deficit hyperactivity disorder (ADHD).

Discography

Albums
 The Competition (with Lower Dens) (Ribbon Music) September 5, 2019
 Escape from Evil (with Lower Dens) (Ribbon Music) March 31, 2015
 Nootropics (with Lower Dens) (Ribbon Music) May 1, 2012
 Twin-Hand Movement (with Lower Dens) (Gnomonsong) July 20, 2010
Carrion EP  CD (Gnomonsong) September 18, 2007
Carrion EP  LP (Woodsist) September 2007
There's No Home  CD/LP (Gnomonsong) April 7, 2007
Blank Unstaring Heirs of Doom  CD (Gnomonsong) October 4, 2005
Jana Hunter / Devendra Banhart LP (split with Devendra Banhart) (Troubleman Unlimited) 2005
 JH CD-R (self-released) 2004
 JH CD-R (self-released) 2003

Compilation appearances
The Enlightened Family CD (Voodoo-EROS), 2005
The Black and White Skins CD (Les Disques du Crépuscule), 2005
The Golden Apples of the Sun CD (Bastet), 2004

External links
Lower Dens site

References

Year of birth missing (living people)
New Weird America
Living people
Singers from Texas
People from Houston
Non-binary musicians
LGBT people from Texas
Transgender musicians
People on the autism spectrum
People with attention deficit hyperactivity disorder
Genderfluid people